Trịnh Quốc Việt (born 4 December 1966) is a Vietnamese sports shooter. He competed in the men's 50 metre pistol event at the 1996 Summer Olympics.

References

External links
 

1966 births
Living people
Vietnamese male sport shooters
Olympic shooters of Vietnam
Shooters at the 1996 Summer Olympics
Place of birth missing (living people)
Shooters at the 1994 Asian Games
Shooters at the 1998 Asian Games
Shooters at the 2002 Asian Games
Shooters at the 2006 Asian Games
Asian Games competitors for Vietnam
20th-century Vietnamese people
21st-century Vietnamese people